Michael A. Wolff (born April 1, 1945) is the dean emeritus of Saint Louis University School of Law and a former Chief Justice of the Supreme Court of Missouri.

Early life and education
He earned his undergraduate degree from Dartmouth College, and his law degree from the University of Minnesota Law School.

Career
Wolff served on the Supreme Court from 1998 to 2011, and as chief justice from 2005 to 2007. Prior to his appointment the Court, he served as chief counsel to the office of Governor Mel Carnahan from 1993 to 1994, and as special counsel from 1994 to 1998. From 1975 to 1993, and again from 2011 to 2013, he served as a law professor at Saint Louis University School of Law.

References

External links
 Michael A. Wolff on the Missouri Supreme Court website
 Michael Wolff faculty page for Saint Louis University School of Law

1945 births
Living people
Chief Justices of the Supreme Court of Missouri
Saint Louis University School of Law faculty
Missouri lawyers
Dartmouth College alumni
University of Minnesota Law School alumni
Politicians from La Crosse, Wisconsin
Judges of the Supreme Court of Missouri